The 2009 Missouri Valley Conference men's soccer season was the 19th season of men's varsity soccer in the conference.

The 2009 Missouri Valley Conference Men's Soccer Tournament was hosted and won by Drake.

Teams

MVC Tournament

See also 

 Missouri Valley Conference
 Missouri Valley Conference men's soccer tournament
 2009 NCAA Division I men's soccer season
 2009 in American soccer

References 

Missouri Valley Conference
2009 NCAA Division I men's soccer season